Mount Gabb is in the central Sierra Nevada in the U.S. state of California. Mount Gabb is in the John Muir Wilderness of Sierra National Forest and is named after William More Gabb, a paleontologist and member of the Whitney Survey.

The ascent up the south face is a class 2-3 climb from Lake Italy. Alternatively, the peak can be accessed from Upper Mills Creek Lake, and is a class 2 climb.

References

Mountains of Fresno County, California
Sierra National Forest